Uncial 0122 (in the Gregory-Aland numbering), α 1030 (Soden), is a Greek uncial manuscript of the New Testament. Palaeographically it has been assigned to the 9th-century. Hort designated it by Od.

Description 
The codex contains a small parts of the Galatians 5:12-6:4 and Hebrews 5:8-6:10 on two parchment leaves (25 cm by 20 cm). The text is written in two columns per page, 28 lines per page, in small uncial letters. It has breathings and accents. There are liturgical markings at the margin in red.

Text 

The Greek text of this codex is a representative of the Byzantine text-type, but with considerable deviations from the Byzantine text (Galatians 5:12.14.17.22.23.24; 6:1.3). Aland placed it in Category III. It means the text of the manuscript has a historical importance.

In Galatians 6:2 its read αναπληρωσατε along with א, A, C, Dgr, K, P, Ψ, 33, 81, 88, 104, 181, Byz.

It was heavily corrected.

History 

Currently it is dated by the INTF to the 9th-century.

The manuscript was examined and described by Constantin von Tischendorf, Eduard de Muralt and Kurt Treu.

The codex now is located in the Russian National Library (Gr. 32), in Saint Petersburg.

See also 

 List of New Testament uncials
 Textual criticism

References

Further reading 

 Eduard de Muralt, Catalogue des manuscrits grecs de la Bibliothèque Impériale publique (Petersburg 1864)
 Kurt Treu, Die Griechischen Handschriften des Neuen Testaments in der USSR; eine systematische Auswertung des Texthandschriften in Leningrad, Moskau, Kiev, Odessa, Tbilisi und Erevan, T & U 91 (Berlin: 1966), pp. 40–41.

External links 
 Uncial 0122 at the Encyclopedia of Textual Criticism

Greek New Testament uncials
9th-century biblical manuscripts
National Library of Russia collection